The Rimsø stone or DR 114 is a runestone from the 10th century near Århus in Denmark. It is one of few runestones raised after a woman, and it is raised by her son who exclaims that losing one's mother is the worst thing that can happen to a boy.

Inscription

Transliteration of the runes into Latin characters
A þuriʀ : bruþiʀ : ainraþa
B rai=sþi : stain : þonsi : ¶ uft : muþur : sina : auk : ¶ ... ku... ¶ ... -auþi : sam : uarst : maki

Transcription into Old Norse
A Þoriʀ, broþiʀ Enraþa,
B resþi sten þænsi æft moþur sina ok ... ... ... [d]øþi sum wærst mægi.

Translation in English
A Þórir, Einráði's brother, 
B raised this stone in memory of his mother and ... ... ... death is the worst (misfortune) for a boy.

See also
List of runestones

Sources
Rundata
A site on Danish runestones with pictures.

Runestones in Denmark
Runestones raised in memory of women
10th-century inscriptions